Kong may refer to:

Places
 Kong Empire (1710–1895), a former African state covering north-eastern Côte d'Ivoire and much of Burkina Faso
 Kong, Iran, a city on the Persian Gulf
 Kong, Shandong, a town in Laoling, Shandong, China
 Kong, Ivory Coast, a town in Savanes District, Ivory Coast
 Kong River, in Southeast Asia

Arts and entertainment

Fictional characters
 King Kong, a giant ape appearing in several films and other works
 Donkey Kong, a series of video games that feature various ape characters that use the Kong name
 Donkey Kong (character)
 Diddy Kong Donkey Kong's partner
 Major T. J. "King" Kong, in the 1964 film Dr. Strangelove
 the title caveman character of Kong the Untamed, a 1975 comic book series
 Giant Robots Kongs, various characters from the Dai Sentai Goggle-V series
 Jake Kong, one of the three main characters from the original The Ghost Busters
 Mammoth Kong, a gigantic ape monster - see Moonlight Mask
 the title robotic monster of Marine Kong, a Japanese TV show
 Blues Kong, a blue colored bulldog/ape hybrid from Android Kikaider

Music
 Kong (band), a Dutch progressive metal band
 "Kong", a song by Tenacious D, released as a B-side on the "POD" single
 "Kong", a song by Neneh Cherry from her 2018 album Broken Politics

Rides
 Kong (Six Flags Discovery Kingdom), a roller coaster
 KONG (ride), a ride at Morey's Piers in Wildwood, New Jersey

Other
 Kong: The Animated Series, an unofficial animated series based on the King Kong character
 Kong: Skull Island, 2017 American film

People
Kong (surname) (孔), a Chinese and Korean surname
 nickname of Gary Elkerton (born 1964), Australian surfer
 nickname of Robbie Green (born 1974), English darts player
 a stage name of Shawn Crahan (born 1969), American musician
 Erika Shishido (born 1970), female professional wrestler who went by the ring name of "Aja Kong"
 Kia Stevens (born 1977), female professional wrestler who went by the ring names of "Amazing Kong" and "Awesome Kong"

Other uses
 Kōng, a concept in Chinese Zen Buddhism
 Kong Company, an American dog toy producer
 Kong Inc., an API and cloud services company based in San Francisco
 KONG (TV), a television station in Washington, United States

See also
 Cong (disambiguation)
 King Kong (disambiguation)
 Donkey Kong (disambiguation)